This is a list of number-one songs as recorded by IRMA’s Top 50 Singles chart — a weekly national survey of popular songs in Ireland.  It is compiled by the IRMA from single sales.

Dates shown represent "week-ending" IRMA issue dates. Prior to 1992, the Irish singles chart was compiled from trade shipments from the labels to record stores, rather than on consumer sales, and were first broadcast on RTÉ on 1 October 1962. Before this charts had been printed in the Evening Herald newspaper, but are under debate as to whether they are official or not, note that the singles mentioned below are only those that come from the 'official chart', and that no information is given for any number 1's before October 1, 1962.

In 1992, the singles chart became based on consumer sales after IFPI and the Irish Recorded Music Association granted a contract to Gallup, a market research company. Gallup installed Epson PX-4 devices in sixty record stores to collect singles sales data. In 1996, Chart-Track was formed as a result of a management buy-out from Gallup. Also in 1996, with the development of technology, EPOS systems were installed in multiple music retail stores. The EPOS systems allowed for the collection of more accurate sales information. Currently, Chart-Track collects data daily from major record stores such as HMV and Tower Records, as well as over forty independent retailers. In total, data from over 380 stores are collected each week. The singles chart is compiled over seven days and released every Friday at noon by the IRMA, while Midweek Charts are produced daily, but only released to IRMA members.

List by decade

1960s
19621963196419651966
196719681969

1970s
1970197119721973197419751976197719781979

1980s
1980198119821983198419851986198719881989

1990s
1990199119921993199419951996199719981999

2000s
2000200120022003200420052006200720082009

2010s
2010201120122013201420152016201720182019

2020s
2020202120222023

See also
List of artists who reached number one in Ireland
IRMA

External links
Current IRMA Single Chart (Top 50).
Chart archive to 1964